Tajikistan has submitted films for the Academy Award for Best International Feature Film since 1999. The award is handed out annually by the United States Academy of Motion Picture Arts and Sciences to a feature-length motion picture produced outside the United States that contains primarily non-English dialogue. It was not created until the 1956 Academy Awards, in which a competitive Academy Award of Merit, known as the Best Foreign Language Film Award, was created for non-English speaking films, and has been given annually since.

As of 2009, two Tajik films have been submitted for the Academy Award for Best Foreign Language Film.

Submissions
The Academy of Motion Picture Arts and Sciences has invited the film industries of various countries to submit their best film for the Academy Award for Best Foreign Language Film since 1956. The Foreign Language Film Award Committee oversees the process and reviews all the submitted films. Following this, they vote via secret ballot to determine the five nominees for the award. Below is a list of the films that have been submitted by Tajikistan for review by the Academy for the award by year and the respective Academy Awards ceremony.

Both submissions were colorful films with strong elements of surrealism incorporated into the story, and both films shared a common composer, renowned Pamiri musician, Daler Nazarov.

Luna Papa is the only Tajik film to successfully screen for the Academy. The movie was chosen in the fall of 1999 to represent Tajikistan for a chance at the 2000 Best Foreign Language Film Oscar. The film was a gentle, absurdist, road-comedy about a 17-year girl (Russian Tatar actress Chulpan Khamatova) in a small village who becomes pregnant after a travelling circus visits her town.

Six years later, Sex & Philosophy, a romantic drama, became the second film submitted by Tajikistan, and in October 2005, AMPAS announced the film had been accepted to compete for a chance at the 2006 Oscars. Sex & Philosophy was directed by Iranian director Mohsen Makhmalbaf but filmed in Tajikistan with an all-Tajik cast, because Iranian censorship regulations made it impossible for Makhmalbaf to make the film as he wanted in Iran. He chose Tajikistan because both countries speak different dialects of the same language (Persian). The film is a talky drama shot in beautiful, bright colors, about a dance instructor in the capital, Dushanbe who decides to invite his four lovers to his dance studio for his 40th birthday.

However, the film was disqualified a month later (along with the Bolivian nominee) when a print of the film failed to arrive in Los Angeles in time for its scheduled screening.

Both films were released on DVD with English subtitles- Papa got a limited US release and Philosophy was released in Singapore.

See also

List of Academy Award winners and nominees for Best Foreign Language Film
List of Academy Award-winning foreign language films

Notes
 Tajikistan's submission to the 78th Academy Awards, Sex & Philosophy, was disqualified because it did not arrive at the Academy on time.

Notes

References

External links
The Official Academy Awards Database
The Motion Picture Credits Database
IMDb Academy Awards Page

Academy Award for Best Foreign Language Film
Lists of films by country of production
Tajikistan
Academy Award